Scarlet Pleasure is a Danish R&B, soul, funk and pop musical trio made up of Emil Goll as lead vocals, Alexander Malone on bass and Joachim Dencker on drums. The formative years of the all-Danish trio was in New York City. They released their 2014 EP Mirage, 2016 album Youth Is Wasted on the Young and 2017 EP Limbo all charting on Tracklisten, the official Danish Albums Chart. The band is signed to Copenhagen Records.

Discography

Studio albums

EPs

Singles

As lead artist

As featured artist

References

External links
Official website
Facebook

Danish musical groups